Joseph Cassin (1 November 1906 – 24 April 1940) was an Italian racing cyclist. He rode in the 1925 Tour de France.

References

1906 births
1940 deaths
Italian male cyclists
Place of birth missing